The 2016 2. deild karla (English: Men's Second Division) was the 51st season of third-tier football in Iceland. Twelve teams contest the league. Play began on 6 May and concluded on 24 September.

Teams
The league is contested by twelve clubs, eight of which played in the division during the 2015 season. There were four new clubs from the previous campaign:
Grótta and Vestri were relegated from the 2015 1. deild karla, replacing Huginn and Leiknir F. who were promoted to the 2016 1. deild karla
Magni and Völsungur were promoted from the 2015 3. deild karla, in place of Tindastóll and Dalvík/Reynir who were relegated to the 2016 3. deild karla

Club information

League table

Results
Each team plays every opponent once home and away for a total of 22 matches per club, and 132 matches altogether.

References

2. deild karla seasons
Iceland
Iceland
3